"Regret" is a song from British indie pop band Everything Everything. The track was released in the United Kingdom on 29 April 2015 as the second single from the band's third studio album, Get to Heaven. The song premiered as BBC Radio 1 DJ Annie Mac's Hottest Record in the World on 29 April 2015.

Track listing

Charts

Release history

References

2015 singles
Everything Everything songs
2015 songs
Songs written by Jonathan Higgs
Geffen Records singles
Song recordings produced by Stuart Price